CashorTrade is a fan-to-fan face-value ticket-reselling market created in 2009 by brothers Brando and Dusty Rich based in Burlington, Vermont.  , the platform had users from 20 countries and had processed over half a million transactions.  The platform offers an optional gold membership which provides early notice of available tickets for an annual fee.

CashorTrade does not allow ticket-scalping, (reselling tickets above the original price). The marketplace is user-policed; tickets sold above face value are flagged and removed.  CashorTrade works with many artists and non-profits dedicated to keeping resale tickets at face value, including Twiddle, Greensky Bluegrass, Billy Strings, The Osiris Podcast Network, The Waterwheel Foundation and Phish.

History 
The service began as a tent in the Phish parking lot outside shows in 2009. The Rich brothers began creating an online interface for the platform; the app is now available for both iPhone and Android users.

In June 2019, CashorTrade launched an escrow service, providing a money-back guarantee on all purchases.

Additional reading 

 Roots Magazine
 NYSMusic.com
 AL Entertainment

References 

Ticket sales companies